Licoricia of Winchester (early 13th century1277) was a Jewish English moneylender. She has been described by historian Robert Stacey as "the most important Jewish woman in medieval England".

She was an English moneylender, wife and mother, who despite the increasingly difficult circumstances of the Jews in thirteenth-century England, which involved regular, punitive taxation, arbitrary imprisonments, and increasing religious intolerance (Fourth Council of the Lateran, blood libel), advanced through advantageous marriages and business acumen. She appears to have had a close relationship with King Henry III.

Life

Licoricia's name reflects a fashion in early thirteenth-century England, among Christian and Jewish women, for exotic names such as Floria, Saffronia, Almonda, Preciosa, Bellassez and Comtissa, and while these names were sometimes replicated in different families, Licoricia appears not to have been such a popular choice. This partly explains why her life and career show up more clearly in the record.

Licoricia first appears in records in 1234, as a young widow with three sons, Cokerel, Benedict, Lumbard, and a daughter, Belia. Her financing activities are documented from the early 1230s, when she lent money in association with other Jews, as well as by herself with an attorney.   She was one of perhaps 1% of the Jewish population working at the highest level of financial dealing; other Jews were involved in a variety of occupations such as metalwork, scribes, doctors, lawyers, wetnurses, midwives, tradesmen and pedlars. 

In 1242, she married her second husband David of Oxford (d. 1244), who was known as the richest Jew in England. He wanted to marry her so much that he divorced his wife Muriel and Henry III prevented the English Beth Din putting obstacles before his remarriage. They had a son, Asher, nicknamed Sweteman, born in 1243. However, Licoricia was detained by the King at the Tower of London for surety for the King's portion of David's estate upon her husband's death in 1244. This portion totalled 5,000 marks. From this, 4,000 marks were used to fund the rebuilding of Westminster Abbey and the shrine to Edward the Confessor. Upon her release, in September 1244, Licoricia returned to live with her family in Winchester, where she continued David's business and began further enterprises of her own.

Over the next 30 years, Licoricia became a highly influential business woman, financing people across Southern England. At the time there were several important female Jews in the field, including Chera and Belia. Her clients included King Henry III and his wife Queen Eleanor of Provence and notable nobles, including Simon de Montfort, 6th Earl of Leicester prior to his rebellion in the Second Barons' War (1264–1267).

Her son Benedict became the only Jewish guildsman in medieval England and probably anywhere else in Western Europe. This enabled him to own tenements and houses, and be a citizen, both of which were impossible for the rest of the Jewish community. Her son by David of Oxford, Asher (sometimes spelled Asser), was imprisoned in Winchester Castle in 1287, whilst the King was attempting to impose a large taxation on the Jews (the thirteenth century witnessed immense taxation on the Jews under John and under Henry III from the 1240s), and left graffiti there, which stated in Hebrew, "On Friday, eve of the Sabbath in which the portion Emor is read, all the Jews of the land of the isle were imprisoned. I, Asher, inscribed this". Little evidence exists of what her other children did, but it is possible they were involved in the activities of most of the Jewish Community, such as trading, jewellery, metalwork, medicine, clerks, or scribes (the vast majority of the community was not involved in significant moneylending). It is unlikely that they were pedlars, like many of the poorest of the community.

The upper limit that the Jews could charge varied between two or three pence per pound per week. The Cahorsins and Lombards could charge as much as 50 per cent; the Jews did not have a monopoly on lending.

In early 1277, Licoricia was found by her daughter Belia, murdered inside her house on Jewry Street with her Christian servant, Alice of Bickton. Three men were indicted for the murders, but none was convicted, and the murder was never solved.

Edward I introduced the Statute of the Jewry in 1275, which prohibited Jews from usury. One of Licoricia's sons, Benedict, was hanged for coin clipping and her family banished from England with the Jewish community by the 1290 Edict of Expulsion.

Legacy
Planning permission for a statue on Jewry Street in Winchester, commemorating Licoricia of Winchester and her son Asher, by the sculptor Ian Rank-Broadley, was granted in August 2018. Funds were raised for this project, to lead people to the history of the medieval Jewish community and their royal connections, as well as to promote tolerance and diversity today, to inspire women and young people, and to beautify Winchester. The unveiling, on 10 February 2022, was to have been performed by the Prince of Wales but he was isolating after he tested positive for COVID-19.  He visited the statue on 3 March 2022.  The statue is opposite where Licoricia's house and the city's thirteenth-century synagogue once stood, outside the Arc (formerly the Winchester Discovery Centre) in Jewry Street. Asher is holding a dreidel (a spinning top), and on the statue's plinth is a quotation from the Book of Leviticus; "Love thy neighbour as thyself" in English and Hebrew.

An illustrated book, commissioned by the Licoricia of Winchester Appeal, entitled Licoricia of Winchester: Power and Prejudice in Medieval England, was written by Rebecca Abrams and published on 9 June 2022.

Hampshire County Council's History Curriculum Centre have written lessons based on Licoricia and her lessons for today for their KS3 pupils which are also available outside Hampshire.

See also 
 Belia of Winchester
 History of the Jews in England (1066–1290)

References

External links 
Licoricia of Winchester Statue Appeal
Licoricia of Winchester by  Cheryl Tallan and Suzanne Bartlet, Shalvi/Hyman Encyclopedia of Jewish Women at Jewish Women's Archive 

13th-century Jews
13th-century English women
13th-century English businesspeople
13th-century births
1277 deaths
Year of birth unknown
Medieval Jewish women
Medieval bankers
Businesspeople from Winchester
English murder victims
13th-century crime
Medieval businesswomen